Francesco Fidanza (1747–1819) was an Italian painter, whose present legacy is based mainly on his landscapes.

Fidanza was born in Rome. He studied under Vernet and Charles-François Lacroix de Marseille (1700–1782). For Eugène Beauharnais he painted the Italian harbors, two of which, Ancona and Malamocco, with a landscape, are in the gallery of the Castle Brera at Milan. Fidanza died in Milan in 1819.

Family
The father of Francesco Fidanza was Filippo Fidanza, who was born at Città di Castello (Sabina) in 1720; he was instructed in painting by Marco Benefial at Rome. Subsequently he studied and imitated the great masters, and many of his works in that genre are on public display in Rome's museums and collections. He died in 1790.

Francesco's brother, Gregorio, was a disciple of Claude Lorrain and Salvator Rosa, whom he imitated with success in his landscapes. He died in 1820.

References

Attribution:
 

1747 births
1819 deaths
18th-century Italian painters
Italian male painters
19th-century Italian painters
19th-century Italian male artists
Italian landscape painters
Painters from Milan
18th-century Italian male artists